Dickey Betts & Great Southern is the second studio album by Dickey Betts of The Allman Brothers Band. It was recorded with his band Great Southern in 1977. The standout tracks are "Sweet Virginia" and the extended-jam "Bougainvillea", which was co-written by Don Johnson.

Critical reception
On AllMusic, Tom Jurek wrote, "Attempting to capture the loose, easy feel of Highway Call and combine it with the more blues-driven sound of the Allmans, Betts was largely successful though the record does suffer a tad from overly slick production.... Great Southern is a very fine album that despite its polish holds a wealth of fine songs and truly astonishing playing within its grooves."

Track listing
"Out to Get Me" (Dickey Betts) – 4:45
"Run Gypsy Run" (Betts, Curtis Buck, Jim Paramore) – 3:34
"Sweet Virginia" (Betts) – 3:44
"The Way Love Goes" (Betts) – 5:03
"Nothing You Can Do" (Betts) – 5:05
"California Blues" (Betts) – 5:04
"Bougainvillea" (Betts, Don Johnson) - 7:16

Personnel
Great Southern
Dickey Betts – electric guitar, slide guitar, lead vocals
"Dangerous Dan" Toler – electric guitar, acoustic guitar, background vocals
Tom Broome – keyboards, background vocals
Ken Tibbets – bass
Jerry Thompson – drums, percussion
Donnie Sharbono – drums, percussion
Additional musicians
Don Johnson – backing vocals on "Bougainvillea"
Topper Price – harmonica on "Out to Get Me" and "Run Gypsy Run"
Mickey Thomas – backing vocals on "Nothing You Can Do"
Production
Produced by Dickey Betts
Recording, production assistant: Steve Klein
Assistant engineer: Stephen Hart
Mixing: Johnny Sandlin, Buddy Thornton
Mastering: George Marino
Art Direction: Bob Heimall
Photography: Benno Friedman

References

Dickey Betts albums
1977 albums
Arista Records albums